Arroio Grande (Portuguese meaning large creek or stream) may refer to:

Arroio Grande, Rio Grande do Sul, Brazil
Arroio Grande, district in Santa Maria, Brazil
Arroio Grande, neighborhood in this district
Arroio Grande, river in Santa Catarina, Brazil